Thomas J. Gibbons (1904–1988), was the Philadelphia Police Department Commissioner appointed by Mayor Joseph S. Clark Jr. in 1952 and retired in 1960.  He was described as "incorruptible" and a "lone wolf" for his intense efforts against La Cosa Nostra, specifically Angelo Bruno, and the corrupt police officers who supported it.

References
 
 New York Times Obituary

1904 births
1988 deaths
People from Philadelphia
Philadelphia Police Department officers
Commissioners of the Philadelphia Police Department